Birch sap, birch water or birch juice is the sap directly tapped from birch trees, Betula pubescens (white birch), Betula pendula (silver birch), Betula lenta, Betula papyrifera, and  Betula fontinalis.

Birch sap may be consumed both fresh and  naturally fermented. When fresh, it is a clear and uncoloured liquid, often slightly sweet with a slightly silky texture. After two to three days, the sap starts fermenting and the taste becomes more acidic.

Birch sap is a traditional beverage in boreal and hemiboreal regions of the Northern Hemisphere  as well as parts of northern China.

Harvest 
Birch sap is collected only at the break of winter and spring when the sap moves intensively. 

Birch sap collection is done by drilling a hole into the tree trunk and leading the sap into a container via some conduit (a tube or simply a thin twig); the sap will flow along it because of the surface tension. The wound is then plugged to minimise infection.

Birch sap has to be collected in early spring before any green leaves have appeared, as in late spring it becomes bitter. The collection period is only about a month per year. 

No published evidence exists to quantify the long-term impacts of sap harvest on birch tree and birch forest health, or birch timber quality. However, the wounds caused by tapping birches consistently lead to dark staining in the wood. In one study, infection and wood decay had spread from more than half of old tapping holes. 

In comparison to maples, birch trees are considered far less tolerant to the wounds caused by tapping,  so more conservative harvesting practises have been recommended by trade bodies such as the Alaska Birch Syrupmakers Association.

Traditional regions
Ancient Balts, Slavs and Finns regarded birch as one of their most sacred trees and made a traditional beverage from it.

Slavic regions
In Slavic regions the sap is known as birch juice as in Russia, Belarus (Byarozavik), Bulgaria (Bulgarian: брезов сок, romanized: brezov sok), Poland, Slovakia, Ukraine.

Baltic regions
Estonia, Finland, Latvia, Lithuania.

Other regions
France, Scotland, Norway, Sweden and elsewhere in Northern Europe as well as parts of northern China and both Hokkaido and Aomori as parts of northern Japan. 

It is also widely used among the Pennsylvania Dutch, both as a traditional beverage in its own right, and particularly as a key ingredient in birch beer.

Composition 

Birch sap contains heterosides (betuloside and monotropitoside), 17 amino acids including glutamic acid, as well as minerals, enzymes, proteins, betulinic acid and betulin, antioxidants, sugar (fructose, glucose and small amounts of sucrose) and vitamins (C and B(group)). Contrary to popular belief, there is no xylitol in birch sap (xylitol is a sugar alcohol that is industrially produced using high temperature and sulfuric acid, or through fermentation).

Nutritional and medicinal uses

Folk uses
Folk uses have been documented which include medicinal use, supplementary nutrition, and cosmetic applications for skin and hair.

Commercial birch sap and derivative products 

Birch sap may be consumed both fresh and naturally fermented. Fresh birch sap is highly perishable; even if refrigerated, it is stable for only up 7 days. Shelf life can be prolonged by freezing or preservation techniques. Existing preservation techniques include:

 Nothing i.e. bottled fresh sap (shelf life: 2–5 days refrigerated)
 Filtered with a 0.22-μ net (shelf life: 3 weeks refrigerated)
 Collected under anaerobic conditions (shelf life: 1 year ambient)
 Added sugar (3 g per 100 ml)
 Heat pasteurized, pasteurization should be conducted under specific temperature levels and times (shelf life: 1 year ambient). Although level of Vitamin C is lower than in fresh sap, all other benefits are preserved.
 Frozen at −25 °C (shelf life: 2 years)

Birch sap can also be used as an ingredient in food or drinks, such as birch beer or wintergreen-flavored candy.

Concentrated birch sap is used to make birch syrup, a very expensive type of syrup mainly made from paper birch in Alaska and Canada, and from several species in Latvia, Russia, Belarus, and Ukraine.

References

External links

 

Non-alcoholic drinks
Alcoholic drinks
Tree tapping
Betula